Kleinite is a rare mineral that has only been found in the United States and Germany that occurs in hydrothermal mercury deposits. It occurs associated with calcite, gypsum and (rarely) barite or calomel. Its color can range from pale yellow/canary yellow to orange, and it is transparent to translucent. As a photosensitive mineral, its coloration darkens when exposed to light.

It has been hypothesized that kleinite formed through a "reaction of cinnabar with oxidized meteoric water", with this reaction being the source of kleinite's nitrogen.

Etymology
Kleinite is named after Carl Klein (1842–1907), who was a professor of mineralogy at the University of Berlin.

See also
 Halide minerals
 List of minerals

References

External links
 

Mercury minerals